This is a list of 161 genera in the family Achilidae, achilid planthoppers.

Achilidae genera

 Abas  c g
 Achilla  c g
 Achilus  c g
 Acixiites  c g
 Acocarinus  c g
 Acus  c g
 Afrachilus  c g
 Agandecca  c g
 Akotropis  c g
 Alticeps  c g
 Amblycratus  c g
 Amphignoma  c g
 Anabunda  c g
 Aneipo  c g
 †Angustachilus  c g
 Apateson  c g
 Aphypia  c g
 Argeleusa  c g
 Aristyllis  c g
 Ballomarius  c g
 Bathycephala  c g
 Benella  c g
 Betatropis  c g
 Booneta  c g
 Brachypyrrhyllis  c g
 Bunduica  c g
 Caffropyrrhyllis  c g
 Calerda  c g
 Callichlamys  c g
 Callinesia  c g
 Caristianus  c g
 Catonia Uhler, 1895 c g b
 Catonidia  c g
 Catonoides  c g
 Cenophron  c g
 Cernea  c g
 Chroneba  c g
 Cionoderella  c g
 Cixidia Fieber, 1866 c g b
 Clidonisma  c g
 Clusivius  c g
 Cnidus  c g
 Cocottea  c g
 Cythna  c g
 Deferunda  c g
 Dipsiathus  c g
 Elidiptera  c g
 Emeljanocarinus  c g
 Epiona  c g
 Epiptera  b
 Epirama  c g
 Epiusana  c g
 Epiusanella  c g
 Errada  c g
 Errotasa  c g
 Eudeferunda  c g
 Eurynomella  c g
 Eurynomeus  c g
 Faventilla  c g
 Flatachilus  c g
 Francesca  c g
 Ganachilla  c g
 Gongistes  c g
 Gordiacea  c g
 Haicixidia  c g
 Haitiana  c g
 Hamba  c g
 Hebrotasa  c g
 Hemiplectoderes  c g
 Hooleya  c g
 Horcomotes  c g
 Ilva  c g
 Indorupex  c g
 Isodaemon  c g
 Juniperthia O'Brien, 1985 c g b
 Kardopocephalus  c g
 Katbergella  c g
 Kawanda  c g
 Kawandella  c g
 Kempiana  c g
 Koloptera  c g
 Kosalya  c g
 Kurandella  c g
 Lanuvia  c g
 Leptarciella  c g
 Mabira  c g
 Magadha  c g
 Magadhaideus  c
 Mahuna  c g
 Martorella  c g
 Maurisca  c g
 Messeis  c g
 Metaphradmon  c g
 Mlanjella  c g
 Momar Fennah, 1950 c g b
 Moraballia  c g
 Mycarinus  c g
 Mycarus  c g
 Myconellus  c g
 Myconus  c g
 Myrophenges  c g
 Nelidia  c g
 Nephelesia  c g
 Nephelia  c g
 Niryasaburnia  c g
 Nyonga  c g
 Olmiana  c g
 Opsiplanon Fennah, 1945 c g b
 Ouwea  c g
 Parabunda  c g
 Paracatonia  c g
 Paracatonidia  c g
 Paraclusivius  c g
 Paragandecca  c g
 Parakosalya  c g
 Paraphradmon  c g
 Paraphypia  c g
 Parargeleusa  c g
 Parasabecoides  c g
 Paratangia  c g
 Paratesum  c g
 Parelidiptera  c g
 Phenelia  c g
 Phradmonicus  c g
 Phypia  c g
 Plectoderes  c g
 Plectoderoides  c g
 Plectoringa  c g
 Prinoessa  c g
 Prosagandecca  c g
 Protepiptera  c g
 Protomenocria  c g
 Pseudhelicoptera  c g
 Psycheona  c g
 Pyrrhyllis  c g
 Quadrana  c g
 Remosachilus  c g
 Rhinochloris  c g
 Rhinocolura  c g
 Rhotala  c g
 Rhotaloides  c g
 Ridesa  c g
 Rupex  c g
 Sabecoides  c g
 Salemina  c g
 Semibetatropis  c g
 Sevia  c g
 Spino  c g
 Symplegadella  c g
 Synecdoche O'Brien, 1971 c g b
 Taloka  c g
 Tangina  c g
 Taractellus  c g
 Thectoceps  c g
 Tropiphlepsia  c g
 Uniptera  c g
 Usana  c g
 Waghilde  c g
 Williamsus  c g
 Xerbus  c g
 Zathauma  c g

Data sources: i = ITIS, c = Catalogue of Life, g = GBIF, b = Bugguide.net

References

Achilidae